Grameen America is a 501(c)(3) nonprofit microfinance organization based in New York City. It was founded by Nobel Peace Prize recipient Muhammad Yunus in 2008. Grameen America is run by former Avon Chairman and CEO Andrea Jung. The organization provides loans, savings programs, financial education, and credit establishment to women who live in poverty in the United States. All loans must be used to build small businesses.

Services

Grameen America offers four key products.
Microloans. The maximum first-time loan is $1,500, though borrowers can return for larger loans once they have repaid their initial loan.
Savings program. Grameen America provides no-fee, no minimum balance savings accounts through commercial partner banks.
Credit Establishment. Grameen America helps members build credit by reporting loan repayments directly to Experian.
Financial Education. Grameen encourages group mentoring during a five-day initial training and weekly meetings with members.

Lending process

The requirements to receive a loan: The individual must be living below the poverty line, located in a community with a Grameen America branch and willing to create or join a five-member group of like-minded individuals who want to start or expand their own businesses. No credit score, collateral, guarantors, or bank account is required.

Grameen America uses a peer-group lending model pioneered by Professor Yunus and the Grameen Bank in Bangladesh. Once a peer group of five lendees is formed, they go through a financial training program and each open savings accounts. Upon completion of the training program, each member receives their loan. Grameen America staff holds mandatory weekly group meetings during which members repay loans, deposit savings and receive peer support and mentoring. Upon successful repayment, members may apply for another loan. The success of the Grameen Bank microfinance model in Bangladesh demonstrates that a high-touch model based on small weekly payments can yield exceptional repayment rates.

Purpose of loans

Grameen America requires all loans to be used to start or expand income-generating businesses. Common businesses include food carts, flower stands, tailoring, jewelry and crafts and salon services.

Locations

Grameen America's first branch, located in Jackson Heights, Queens, opened in January 2008. As of 2017, Grameen America operates in Queens, Brooklyn, Bronx and Manhattan, New York, as well as in Omaha, Nebraska, Indianapolis, Indiana, Charlotte, North Carolina, San Francisco Bay Area, Los Angeles, and San Jose, California, Austin, Texas, Union City, New Jersey, Boston, Massachusetts, and Miami, Florida.

Previously concentrated almost entirely around New York, Grameen America now has 20 branches in 13 cities. It plans to expand to Houston in late 2018.

History

Grameen America was founded upon the belief that Grameen Bank's microfinance lending system could work in urban America as well as it had in Bangladesh. Professor Yunus believed that for the world to acknowledge the power of microfinance, it must work in the capital of international finance, New York City, where there exists a huge population of people who do not have access to banks and mainstream financial institutions. Grameen America opened its doors in January 2008 during the largest financial crisis of the modern era. In September 2018, Grameen America hit a notable milestone, having dispersed $1 billion in microloans to over 100,000 of its members in the ten years since its founding.

Statistics

As of the end of 2017, Grameen America had disbursed over $760 million in micro-loans to more than 95,000 low-income women in the United States.

Management

Board of Directors:

Muhammad Yunus - Chairman of the Board of Directors
Michael D. Granoff
Antonia Hernández
Vidar Jorgensen
Andrea Jung
Hope Knight
H.I. Latifee
Mahmoud Mamdani
John Megrue
Karen Pritzker

Directors Emeritus:
Ray Dalio
Sila M. Calderón

Senior Leadership:
Andrea Jung - President and CEO, Grameen America
Shah Newaz - Chief Advisor
David Gough - Senior Vice President & Chief Financial Officer
Mindee Barham - Vice President of Development
Miriam Benitez - Vice President of Human Resources

Affiliation

Grameen America is a Grameen replication project.

References

External links
 Official website
 "Giving Capitalism a Social Conscience". The New York Times. October 10, 2017.
 "Dalio Says This Microfinance Lender Can Fix ‘Issue of Our Time’". Bloomberg. September 25, 2017.
 "Grameen America will open micro-lending branch in Miami". Miami Herald. October 3, 2017.
"Poverty Alleviation in the United States: Whole Planet Foundation and Grameen America". YouTube. February 16, 2012.
 "Nonprofit gives microloans to low-income Americans". Morning Joe (MSNBC). September 26, 2011.
"Dan Rather Reports Excerpt from 'Grameen America'". YouTube. January 28, 2011.
"The Conversation: Can Microloans Change the World?". ABC News. May 19, 2010.

Non-profit microfinance organizations based in North America
Non-profit organizations based in New York City
Organizations established in 2008
Charities based in New York City